5S may refer to:

 5S (methodology), a Japanese management methodology
 5S ribosomal RNA
 Select Society of Sanitary Sludge Shovelers
 A series of Toyota S engines 
 A technique for calming babies, as suggested by Harvey Karp 
 iPhone 5S, a smartphone by Apple Inc.
5S, the production code for the 1981 Doctor Who serial Warriors' Gate
Fives, an English sport

See also
S5 (disambiguation)
5 (disambiguation)